Sujebi (in S. Korea), ttŭdŏ-guk (in N. Korea), or hand-pulled dough soup, or Korean-style pasta soup, is a Korean traditional soup consisting of dough flakes roughly torn by hand, with various vegetables. The flavor and recipe resemble kalguksu, except that the latter is made with noodles rather than wheat flakes. It is commonly considered a dish to consume on rainy days, along with bindaetteok.

The broth for sujebi is usually made with dried anchovies, shellfish, and kelp. In order to obtain a rich, umami flavor, the ingredients should be simmered for many hours. Added to this broth are soft noodles and various vegetables or kimchi, most often zucchini and potatoes.

Origin

From the Joseon period, people started making various types of  according to various purposes.  is today considered a typical commoner's food, but in the past, it was relatively rare and used for special occasions especially janchi (feast, banquet) such as dol janchi (the celebration of a baby's first birthday).

In North Korea,  is called , which is the words comprising three words:  (literally "wheat flour") +  (literally "tearing" or "torn")  (literally "soup").

The names of  vary according to regions in Korea.

Gallery

See also
Kalguksu
Bindaetteok
Korean noodles

References

External links
Brief information and recipe of Spinach and Carrot Sujebi
 The Korean people's food, Sujebi from Chosunilbo
Information about “Samcheongdong Sujebi” from Korea Tourism Organization

Korean cuisine
Anchovy dishes